Abu Said Uthman I, or "Othmane Ibn Yaghmoracen", or in Algerian arabic ( أبو سعيد عثمان الأول, Abu Sa'id Othman āl-awel), ruled the Zenata Berber Kingdom of Tlemcen in Medieval Algeria from 1283 to 1303.

Biography
Abu Said Uthman I succeeded his father Abu Yahya Yaghmurasen ibn Zayyan (1236–1282) as ruler of the Zayyanid dynasty. He was the pearl of perfection, lord of (diverse) fractions of the Abd el-Wad family. He was the bravest and one of the most fearsome warriors of his tribe  He annexed to his empire the countries of his enemies and defended the lands of his subjects. His empire was luxurious and the cities were said to have been well administrated. Through marriages with the Hafsids, he was able to establish good relations with his eastern neighbors. This allowed Uthman I to withstand the ongoing attacks of the Marinids of Fez. The fighting led to devastating results in his Empire. The siege of Tlemcen by the Marinids was maintained from 1299 to 1307 during which the Marinids built the siege city of al-Mansura, which was at times even residence of the Marinid rulers. Despite the superiority of the Marinids, the Zayyanids were able to assert themselves, showing the support the dynasty had by the population of the empire.

Uthman I did not live to see the end of the siege. Only under his successor Abu Zayyan I Muhammad (1303-1308) did the Marinids withdraw back to Al-Maghrib (al-Aqsa) after the death of their Sultan and as dynastic infighting broke out there.

Expeditions

Uthman I was a warrior, he took part in many sieges and battles consolidating his power within his empire and against his rivals (mainly the Marinids).

In 1287 he took the city of Mâzoûna (located on the right bank of the Chelif River from the Maghrawa and laid siege to the city of Taferdjint (no longer an existing city, possibly on the left bank of the Chelif River in the country of the Toudjin).
In 1290–91, the King of Tlemcen launched another expedition against the Toudjin. He victoriously marched through their country as he took control of the Wâncharis mountain, their refuge. Uthman I took the women and son of Mohammed Ibn‘Abd el-Qawi as prisoners but then sends them back to their domiciles.
 During May 1289, Abou  Sa'id took the city of Ténès from the Maghrawas and from the Toudjin the city of Médéa.
 The Marinid Sultan Abou Ya‘qoûb ben‘Abd el H’aqq marched against Tlemcen and camps not too far from the city Tuesday on 25 July 1290. On 27 September he returns to his capital after fierce combat and memorable attacks. 
During the 18th of the following month (August) of the same year, Abou Sa'id attacked the Maghrawas that had established relations with the Marinid ruler during the siege, he conquered their country and forced them to obeisance, leaving his son Abu Hammu I in command of the city of Chelif. Uthman I then returns to Tlemcen.
 On 28 April 1291, the Sultan marches against the Toudjin yet again, he kills their king and devastates their country. Then goes back to his capital.
In 1293–94 Abou Sa'id takes the city of Brechk located 19 miles west from Cherchell and 8 miles East of Ténès from Tsabit ben Mandil of the Maghrawa after 40 days of siege. Tasbit manages to flee to Al-Maghreb (al-Aqsa)by sea.
During 1295–96, the Marinid Sultan marches against Tlemcen for the second time. He camps under the walls of Nedroma, then heads to mount Djidara (near Oran) then finally goes back to his kingdom.
In the same year the Sultan of Tlemcen launches an expedition against the Arabs and camps at Ma Taghalin and mount Ha'nach ( possibly near Constantine) not far from the Sahara and kicks the Arabs from the region.

Legacy
Abu Said Uthman I was considered to be a great ruler, he managed to conserve the integrity of his empire repelling four attacks by the Marinid Abou Ya‘qoûb ben‘Abd el H’aqq (died during the 5th)  and punished the rebels who revolted against him.

See also

References

 Stephan Ronart, Nandy Ronart: Dictionary of the Arab World.  A historical-political reference work.  Artemis Verlag, Zurich et al. 1972,  .

Algeria

Berber rulers
Zayyanid dynasty
People from Tlemcen
13th-century Berber people
13th-century monarchs in Africa
14th-century monarchs in Africa